Alain Macle (18 April 1944 – 21 March 2020) was a French ski jumper. He competed at the 1968 Winter Olympics and the 1972 Winter Olympics.

References

External links
 

1944 births
2020 deaths
French male ski jumpers
Olympic ski jumpers of France
Ski jumpers at the 1968 Winter Olympics
Ski jumpers at the 1972 Winter Olympics
People from Les Rousses
Sportspeople from Jura (department)